Colymbiculus is an extinct genus of loon  that lived in Novopskov, Ukraine 
in the Eocene.

References

Extinct birds of Europe
Gaviiformes
Eocene birds